is a city located in the western portion of Tokyo Metropolis, Japan. , the city had an estimated population of 195,207 in 93,654 households, and a population density of 9500 persons per km².

Geography
Kodaira is located in the Musashino Terrace near the geographic centre of Tokyo Metropolis.

Surrounding municipalities
Tokyo Metropolis
Nishitokyo
Tachikawa
Higashimurayama
Higashiiyamato
Higashikurume
Kokubunji
Koganei

Climate
Kodaira has a Humid subtropical climate (Köppen Cfa) characterized by warm summers and cool winters with light to no snowfall.  The average annual temperature in Kodaira is 14.0 °C. The average annual rainfall is 1647 mm with September as the wettest month. The temperatures are highest on average in August, at around 25.5 °C, and lowest in January, at around 2.6 °C.

Demographics
Per Japanese census data, the population of Kodaira increased rapidly in the 1950s and 1960s.

History
The area of present-day Kodaira was part of ancient Musashi Province, but was a largely unpopulated area under the opening of the Tamagawa Aqueduct in the Edo period made agriculture possible. In the post-Meiji Restoration cadastral reform of July 22, 1878, the area became part of Kitatama District in Kanagawa Prefecture. The village of Kodaira was created on April 1, 1889 with the establishment of the modern municipalities system. Kitatama District was transferred to the administrative control of Tokyo Metropolis on April 1, 1893. The population of the area expanded after the 1923 Great Kantō earthquake with the relocation of universities and housing areas from central Tokyo. Kodaira was elevated to town status in 1944 and to city status on October 1, 1962.

Government
Kodaira has a mayor-council form of government with a directly elected mayor and a unicameral city council of 28 members. Kodaira contributes two members to the Tokyo Metropolitan Assembly. In terms of national politics, the city is part of Tokyo 18th district of the lower house of the Diet of Japan.

Education

Universities
Tsuda College
 Kaetsu University
 Musashino Art University
 Hitotsubashi University (Kodaira campus)
Shiraume Gakuen College
Shiraume Gakuen Junior College

Primary and secondary schools
The Tokyo Metropolitan Government Board of Education operates three public high schools. There is also one special education school for the handicapped.
 
 
 

Kodaira has 19 public elementary school and eight public junior high schools. 

Public junior high schools:
 Hana Koganei Minami (花小金井南中学校)
 Josui (上水中学校)
 Kodaira No. 1 (小平第一中学校)
 Kodaira No. 2 (小平第二中学校)
 Kodaira No. 3 (小平第三中学校)
 Kodaira No. 4 (小平第四中学校)
 Kodaira No. 5 (小平第五中学校)
 Kodaira No. 6 (小平第六中学校)

Public elementary schools:
 Gakuen Higashi (学園東小学校)
 Hana Koganei (花小金井小学校)
 Kamijuku (上宿小学校)
 Kodaira No. 1 (小平第一小学校)
 Kodaira No. 2 (小平第二小学校)
 Kodaira No. 3 (小平第三小学校)
 Kodaira No. 4 (小平第四小学校)
 Kodaira No. 5 (小平第五小学校)
 Kodaira No. 6 (小平第六小学校)
 Kodaira No. 7 (小平第七小学校)
 Kodaira No. 8 (小平第八小学校)
 Kodaira No. 9 (小平第九小学校)
 Kodaira No. 10 (小平第十小学校)
 Kodaira No. 11 (小平第十一小学校)
 Kodaira No. 12 (小平第十二小学校)
 Kodaira No. 13 (小平第十三小学校)
 Kodaira No. 14 (小平第十四小学校)
 Kodaira No. 15 (小平第十五小学校)
 Suzuki (鈴木小学校)

There are two private elementary schools, three private junior high schools, and three private high schools.
 
 
 
 Salesians of Don Bosco Salesian Primary and Junior High School (サレジオ小学校・中学校)

Miscellaneous school
 Korea University

Transportation

Railway
 JR East – Musashino Line

 Seibu Railway - Seibu Shinjuku Line
 - 
 Seibu Railway - Seibu Tamako Line
 - 
 Seibu Railway - Seibu Kokubunji Line
 - 
 Seibu Railway - Seibu Haijima Line
 - <Higashi-Murayama> -

Highway
Kodaira is not served by any national highways or expressways.

Local attractions
Koganei Park
Edo-Tokyo Open Air Architectural Museum
Kodaira Municipal Cemetery
Kodaiara Hirakushi Denchu Art Museum
Gas Museum

Notable people from Kodaira
Kōji Tsujitani, voice actor
Shun Oguri, actor
Ryuhei Kawada, politician

References

External links

Kodaira City Official Website 

 
Cities in Tokyo
Western Tokyo